is a railway station in Higashi-ku, Fukuoka, Japan. The station serves the Kashii-Kaen amusement park.

Adjacent Stations

Lines 
 Nishi-Nippon Railroad (Nishitetsu)
 Kaizuka Line

Station layout 
The station is above ground level with one island platform and one track.

Tracks

Surrounding area
Kashii Kaen

Railway stations in Fukuoka Prefecture
Railway stations in Japan opened in 1941